Federico Palana better known by the stage name Fred De Palma (born in Turin, 3 November 1989) is an Italian rapper and singer.

Biography

Royal Rhymes 
Fred De Palma began his musical career in 2007 in Turin, with freestyling skills. Many freestyle contests in Turin and Milan put him in attention of the industry, and in 2010 he collaborated with Dirty C, creating the band Royal Rhymes, and started to experiment in the studio. At the beginning of 2010, the group signed a recording contract with the independent record label Trumen Records, and collaborated with producers Jahcool and Double H Groovy. Around the same time, Fred De Palma continued with the participation in various freestyle competitions, achieving a victory at Zelig Urban Talent 2011 and third place in 2012 at the MTV television program Spit, behind Nitro and Shade. On November 23, 2011, Royal Rhymes released their eponymous debut album, released through the Saifam Group. This was followed by the EP God Save the Royal, released on 10 July 2012.

Solo career 
During 2012, Fred De Palma started a solo career, recording his first album FDP released on 6 November of the same year. In June 2013 the video clip for "Passa il microfono" was published, which he produced together with rappers Moreno, Clementino, Shade and Marracash,. In September 2013, he joined the collective Roccia Music alongside Marracash, creating the album Genesi with the artists belonging to the collective, released on October 18, 2013. that contained four tracks by De Palma, including "Lettera al successo", which gave the title to his second studio album released in June 2014 as Lettera al successo.

On 17 December 2014, he announced his withdrawal from the Roccia Music collective due to reasons he defined as private. Later, on 10 February 2015, he revealed that he had signed a recording contract with Warner Music Italy, with which he released his third album BoyFred, released on 2 October 2015.

In September 2017 he released his fourth album Hanglover, with pre-release singles "Adiós", "Il cielo guarda te" and "Ora che". On the album the artist collaborated with several producers including Takagi & Ketra, Davide Ferrario, Mace and others. On 15 June 2018, he released the single "D'estate non vale", in collaboration with Ana Mena. A year later, he renewed his collaboration with the Spanish singer, with the summer single "Una volta ancora".

Discography

Soloist 
 FDP (2012)
 Lettera al successo (2014)
 BoyFred (2015)
 Hanglover (2017)
 Uebe (2019)
 Unico (2021)

With Royal Rhymes 
 Royal Rhymes (2011)
 God Save the Royal (2012, EP)

Singles

References

1989 births
Living people
Italian rappers
Musicians from Turin